Louisa Journeaux (8 February 1864 – August 30, 1939) born Elder Cottage, St. Clement's Road, in the parish of St. Clement on the island of Jersey, was lost at sea and presumed dead until she turned up at Newfoundland, Canada. The crew of the ship Curlew had spotted her and took her on board to continue their cross-Atlantic voyage to Newfoundland.

On April 18, 1886, Journeaux and her cousin Julia Wiltshire had attended an Evensong at the Church of England chapel at Saint Helier when leaving met two Frenchmen, a Jules Farné and M.G. Radiguet. The four had rented two boats to enjoy a pleasant row in the moonlit night when Farné had lost the oar and jumped in to retrieve it and eventually lost sight of Journeaux, who was left on the row-boat. Amidst the shouts of anguish, the owner of the boats had found Farné clinging to a pier with no sign of the boat in sight. A search party was formed to find Journeaux to no avail.

On April 19 when a tugboat sent out to find Journeaux returned without her, Farné was arrested by Centenier Le Gros and tried on the charge of neglect and imprudence which caused the death or disappearance of Louisa Journeaux. The trial could not convict Farne of anything and the charges were dropped. Sensing the hostility of the islanders, he had left for Paris.

The community feared the worst that Journeaux was dead when a telegram reached her father from the Colonial Secretary for the government of Newfoundland. It read:

Journeaux was transported from St. George's Bay back to St. John's on Bowring's vessel Curlew, upon which she was given freedom of their dry goods and clothing store. She was left in the care of Archdeacon Botwood and was also received at Government House by His Excellency Sir William Des Vœux and his lady. On June 2, 1886, she left aboard the ship Siberian for Liverpool and to greet her parents. From there she left on the Brittany to Saint Helier harbour, where she was greeted by a waiting crowd of well-wishers. Journeaux's journey lasted fifty-five days to arrive at the same pier she had left for a leisure row with her cousin and two Frenchmen. Farné was never heard from again but was eventually exonerated by Journeaux's letter she wrote back to home while she was in Newfoundland awaiting transportation back home. Journeaux married a Londoner by the name of Wyse. She died on August 30, 1939.

References

1939 deaths
People from Saint Clement, Jersey
Newfoundland Colony people
1864 births